Henry Ekubo (born 17 August 1982) is a retired Nigerian footballer.

Football career
Ekubo started his career at St. Gallen. He made his debut in 2000–01 season and move on loan to Kriens of Challenge League. He returned to St. Gallen in 2003–04 season.

Ekubo  left the club in summer 2004, and played in the lower league. Except for YF Juventus and FC Gossau in the Challenge League, he played in 1. Liga clubs.

References

1982 births
Living people
Nigerian footballers
Nigeria international footballers
Nigerian expatriate footballers
Swiss Super League players
Swiss Challenge League players
FC St. Gallen players
FC Gossau players
Association football forwards
SC Young Fellows Juventus players
FC Chur 97 players
FC Rapperswil-Jona players
FC Kreuzlingen players
Nigerian expatriate sportspeople in Switzerland
Expatriate footballers in Switzerland
Sportspeople from Jos